Zlatan Nalić (born 23 January 1969) is a Bosnian professional football manager and former player.

Playing career
During his playing career, Nalić played for Sloboda Tuzla, where he started his career, Borac Banja Luka, Sloga Kraljevo, Panathinaikos, Mjällby, Motala and Kulladal.

Managerial career

Early career
Nalić started his managerial career as an assistant manager in the Sweden U21 national team. With them he won the UEFA Euro U21 in 2015. After Sweden, in November 2017, Nalić was named new manager of Swedish fourth tier club Prespa Birlik.

Sloboda Tuzla
On 31 July 2018, Nalić became the new manager of Bosnian Premier League club Sloboda Tuzla. His first win as the club manager came on 11 August 2018, in the Tuzla derby against Tuzla City, which Sloboda won 1–0. Nalić was praised for bringing a style in Bosnian football which it did not see before.

On 20 April 2019, Sloboda under Nalić also made a big result by beating Sarajevo 2–1 at home and getting back to the UEFA Europa League qualifying "picture". However, poor results during the ending of the season meant an 8th-place finish for Sloboda, only 5 points more than 11th placed and relegated Krupa.

On 3 June 2019, Nalić left Sloboda after his contract with the club expired.

Tuzla City
On 11 March 2020, Sloboda's city rival, Tuzla City, announced Nalić as the club's new manager. However, he did not get the chance to lead Tuzla in a match until 2 August 2020, because the 2019–20 Bosnian Premier League season was ended abruptly due to the ongoing COVID-19 pandemic in Bosnia and Herzegovina. When the match did come, on 2 August, Nalić's first official game as manager of Tuzla City did not however go to plan as the team lost to Široki Brijeg. His first win as Tuzla City manager was a 1–0 league win against Krupa on 8 August 2020.

Nalić left Tuzla City on 16 October 2020, after a hard 0–4 league loss against Zrinjski Mostar.

Personal life
Zlatan is the son of Sloboda Tuzla legend Mesud Nalić. Nalić's son Adi, is also a professional footballer who plays for Malmö FF in the Swedish Allsvenskan.

Managerial statistics

References

External links

1969 births
Living people
Sportspeople from Banja Luka
Association football midfielders
Yugoslav footballers
Bosnia and Herzegovina footballers
FK Sloboda Tuzla players
FK Borac Banja Luka players
FK Sloga Kraljevo players
Panathinaikos F.C. players
Mjällby AIF players
Motala AIF players
Yugoslav First League players
Ettan Fotboll players
Bosnia and Herzegovina expatriate footballers
Expatriate footballers in Serbia and Montenegro
Bosnia and Herzegovina expatriate sportspeople in Serbia and Montenegro
Expatriate footballers in Greece
Bosnia and Herzegovina expatriate sportspeople in Greece
Expatriate footballers in Sweden
Bosnia and Herzegovina expatriate sportspeople in Sweden
Bosnia and Herzegovina football managers
FK Sloboda Tuzla managers
FK Tuzla City managers
Premier League of Bosnia and Herzegovina managers
Expatriate football managers in Sweden